State vector may refer to:
A quantum state vector
The state of a system described by a state space representation
A state vector (geographical) specifies the position and velocity of an object in any location on Earth's surface
Orbital state vectors are vectors of position and velocity that together with their time, uniquely determine the state of an orbiting body in astrodynamics or in celestial dynamics